The order-6 cubic honeycomb is a paracompact regular space-filling tessellation (or honeycomb) in hyperbolic 3-space. It is paracompact because it has vertex figures composed of an infinite number of facets, with all vertices as ideal points at infinity. With Schläfli symbol {4,3,6}, the honeycomb has six ideal cubes meeting along each edge. Its vertex figure is an infinite triangular tiling. Its dual is the order-4 hexagonal tiling honeycomb.

Images

Symmetry 

A half-symmetry construction of the order-6 cubic honeycomb exists as {4,3[3]}, with two alternating types (colors) of cubic cells. This construction has Coxeter-Dynkin diagram  ↔ .  

Another lower-symmetry construction, [4,3*,6], of index 6, exists with a non-simplex fundamental domain, with Coxeter-Dynkin diagram .

This honeycomb contains  that tile 2-hypercycle surfaces, similar to the paracompact order-3 apeirogonal tiling, :

Related polytopes and honeycombs 
The order-6 cubic honeycomb is a regular hyperbolic honeycomb in 3-space, and one of 11 which are paracompact.

It has a related alternation honeycomb, represented by  ↔ . This alternated form has hexagonal tiling and tetrahedron cells.

There are fifteen uniform honeycombs in the [6,3,4] Coxeter group family, including the order-6 cubic honeycomb itself.

The order-6 cubic honeycomb is part of a sequence of regular polychora and honeycombs with cubic cells.

It is also part of a sequence of honeycombs with triangular tiling vertex figures.

Rectified order-6 cubic honeycomb 

The rectified order-6 cubic honeycomb, r{4,3,6},  has cuboctahedral and triangular tiling facets, with a hexagonal prism vertex figure.

It is similar to the 2D hyperbolic tetraapeirogonal tiling, r{4,∞},  alternating apeirogonal and square faces:

Truncated order-6 cubic honeycomb 

The truncated order-6 cubic honeycomb, t{4,3,6},  has truncated cube and triangular tiling facets, with a hexagonal pyramid vertex figure.

It is similar to the 2D hyperbolic truncated infinite-order square tiling, t{4,∞},  with apeirogonal and octagonal (truncated square) faces:

Bitruncated order-6 cubic honeycomb 

The bitruncated order-6 cubic honeycomb is the same as the bitruncated order-4 hexagonal tiling honeycomb.

Cantellated order-6 cubic honeycomb 

The cantellated order-6 cubic honeycomb, rr{4,3,6},  has rhombicuboctahedron, trihexagonal tiling, and hexagonal prism facets, with a wedge vertex figure.

Cantitruncated order-6 cubic honeycomb 

The cantitruncated order-6 cubic honeycomb, tr{4,3,6},  has truncated cuboctahedron, hexagonal tiling, and hexagonal prism facets, with a mirrored sphenoid vertex figure.

Runcinated order-6 cubic honeycomb 

The runcinated order-6 cubic honeycomb is the same as the runcinated order-4 hexagonal tiling honeycomb.

Runcitruncated order-6 cubic honeycomb 

The runcitruncated order-6 cubic honeycomb, rr{4,3,6},  has truncated cube, rhombitrihexagonal tiling, hexagonal prism, and octagonal prism facets, with an isosceles-trapezoidal pyramid vertex figure.

Runcicantellated order-6 cubic honeycomb 

The runcicantellated order-6 cubic honeycomb is the same as the runcitruncated order-4 hexagonal tiling honeycomb.

Omnitruncated order-6 cubic honeycomb 

The omnitruncated order-6 cubic honeycomb is the same as the omnitruncated order-4 hexagonal tiling honeycomb.

Alternated order-6 cubic honeycomb 

In three-dimensional hyperbolic geometry, the alternated order-6 hexagonal tiling honeycomb is a uniform compact space-filling tessellation (or honeycomb).

Symmetry 

A half-symmetry construction from the form {4,3[3]} exists, with two alternating types (colors) of triangular tiling cells. This form has Coxeter-Dynkin diagram  ↔ . Another lower-symmetry form of index 6, [4,3*,6], exists with a non-simplex fundamental domain, with Coxeter-Dynkin diagram .

Related honeycombs 

The alternated order-6 cubic honeycomb is part of a series of quasiregular polychora and honeycombs.

It also has 3 related forms: the cantic order-6 cubic honeycomb, h2{4,3,6}, ; the runcic order-6 cubic honeycomb, h3{4,3,6}, ; and the runcicantic order-6 cubic honeycomb, h2,3{4,3,6}, .

Cantic order-6 cubic honeycomb 

The cantic order-6 cubic honeycomb is a uniform compact space-filling tessellation (or honeycomb) with Schläfli symbol h2{4,3,6}. It is composed of truncated tetrahedron, trihexagonal tiling, and hexagonal tiling facets, with a rectangular pyramid vertex figure.

Runcic order-6 cubic honeycomb 

The runcic order-6 cubic honeycomb is a uniform compact space-filling tessellation (or honeycomb) with Schläfli symbol h3{4,3,6}. It is composed of tetrahedron, hexagonal tiling, and rhombitrihexagonal tiling facets, with a triangular cupola vertex figure.

Runcicantic order-6 cubic honeycomb 

The runcicantic order-6 cubic honeycomb is a uniform compact space-filling tessellation (or honeycomb), with Schläfli symbol h2,3{4,3,6}. It is composed of truncated hexagonal tiling, truncated trihexagonal tiling, and truncated tetrahedron facets, with a mirrored sphenoid vertex figure.

See also 
 Convex uniform honeycombs in hyperbolic space
 Regular tessellations of hyperbolic 3-space
 Paracompact uniform honeycombs

References 
Coxeter, Regular Polytopes, 3rd. ed., Dover Publications, 1973. . (Tables I and II: Regular polytopes and honeycombs, pp. 294–296)
 The Beauty of Geometry: Twelve Essays (1999), Dover Publications,  (Chapter 10, Regular Honeycombs in Hyperbolic Space) Table III
 Jeffrey R. Weeks The Shape of Space, 2nd edition  (Chapter 16-17: Geometries on Three-manifolds I,II)
 Norman Johnson Uniform Polytopes, Manuscript
 N.W. Johnson: The Theory of Uniform Polytopes and Honeycombs, Ph.D. Dissertation, University of Toronto, 1966 
 N.W. Johnson: Geometries and Transformations, (2018) Chapter 13: Hyperbolic Coxeter groups

Honeycombs (geometry)